Sarah Muirhead-Allwood  (FRCS) (born 1947), is a British orthopaedic surgeon known for performing complex hip resurfacings and unusual hip replacements. Those she has operated on include The Queen Mother and Andy Murray.

In 2002 she founded the London Hip Unit, to provide adults with hip problems a range of supportive services.

Early life and education
Sarah Muirhead-Allwood, was born William Muirhead-Allwood, in 1947. She attended Wellington College, Berkshire, and gained her medical degree from St Thomas's Hospital Medical School, in 1971.

Career

Following a house job with Ronald Furlong, who influenced her choice of hip surgery, she gained experience in cardiac surgery and worked with the orthopaedic surgeons Lorden Trickey and Tony Caterall at the Royal National Orthopaedic Hospital (RNOH). Subsequently, she was appointed consultant orthopaedic surgeon at the Whittington Hospital, London and the Royal Northern Hospital in 1984, and at the RNOH in 1991.

Muirhead-Allwood has been operating on hips for over 25 years, with a focus on replacements that are unusual and revisions that are complex. She later collaborated with Jonathan Jeffers and Imperial College's medical engineering department, to look at the function of the hip capsule.

Other roles
In 2002 she founded the London Hip Unit, to provide adults with hip problems a range of supportive services. She is a member of several hip societies including the International Hip Society.

Notable operations
At the King Edward VII Hospital for Officers (KEVII), she assisted Sir Roger Vickers in the hip replacement surgery on the Queen Mother in 1995. In 2019, at the Princess Grace Hospital, she operated on the tennis player Andy Murray, who subsequently continued playing successful tennis. Others operated on by Muir-Allwood include Eamonn Holmes and Charles Collingwood.

Personal and family
In 1996, she publicly disclosed her gender reassignment plans to the tabloid press. The KEVII committee initially disallowed her admitting privileges, a decision that was reversed. In 2003 she appeared in a documentary. Muirhead-Allwood was previously married and they have two sons.

Selected publications

See also
List of honorary medical staff at King Edward VII's Hospital for Officers

References

External links
The London Hip Unit
 

1947 births
English surgeons
Living people
Fellows of the Royal College of Surgeons
British orthopaedic surgeons